Vojo Stanić (Montenegrin:  Vojo Stanić/Војо Станић, born 3 February 1924) is a Montenegrin painter and sculptor.

Biography
Vojo Stanić was born in Podgorica, and grew up in Nikšić. He completed Academy of Sculpture in Belgrade, after which he moved to Herceg Novi.

During that time he turned to painting, enabling him to better express his peace-loving, Mediterranean spirit and interest in people. His paintings are small drama stories from everyday life, full of spirit. They bring back to life the spirit of Renaissance comedies, presenting human weaknesses and at the same time he shows understanding for them. Topics from cafes, sea or home are often a mixture of surreal details or imaginative relationship of characters and objects.

He is one of the most important modern Montenegrin painters, and is a member of CANU and DANU. He had several individual exhibits. The most important exhibit of his was at Venice Biennale in 1997.

His paintings are exhibited in a number of galleries in Montenegro, as well as in the permanent exhibit in the Art Museum in Cetinje.

References

Artists from Podgorica
1924 births
Living people
Montenegrin painters
Montenegrin sculptors
Members of the Montenegrin Academy of Sciences and Arts
Yugoslav artists